Liotyphlops albirostris (common name Whitenose blind snake) is a species of snake in the Anomalepididae family. It is endemic to Central America. The snake has been reported from Colombia, Curaçao, Panama and Venezuela.

References

Anomalepididae
Snakes of Central America
Snakes of South America
Reptiles of the Caribbean
Reptiles of Colombia
Reptiles of Panama
Reptiles of Venezuela
Reptiles described in 1857